The Bischheim Musée du bain rituel juif (Jewish ritual bath museum of Bischheim) is a museum in Bischheim, France, in which Jewish bathing rituals were practiced, now recognized as a historical monument in France.

History

The large, half-timbered house was built by Stettmeister Jacques Frédéric Boecklin de Boecklinsau, 
the second son of Jean-Philippe Boecklin.  The Jewish banker Baruch Lévy acquired it during the French Revolution.
He arranged for the mikveh to be built in the basement.
In the Jewish tradition the word mikveh, a gathering of the waters, designates an underground basin supplied with pure water by a natural spring.
The Bischheim bath is an unusual example.
The bath is more important than a synagogue because of the strict laws in the Jewish tradition that related to hygiene.
It was also used for the monthly purification of women.

On 17 May 1977 the mikveh was classified a historic monument.
It has been carefully restored.
The house is also used for the municipal library.

Description

A spiral staircase leads down to the vault, built in Renaissance style, that dates to the last quarter of the sixteenth century. 
The staircase has been completely renovated.
There are niches in the wall to hold candles or oil lamps.
Heavy rains and periods of high water provide clear water to the bath. 

Museum

The David Sintzheim room of the museum on the ground floor presents a collection of Jewish religious objects and documents related to the history of Judaism in Bischeim. Objects include the scrolls of the Torah, a wine jug for the Kiddush ceremony and a Menorah candlestick.
Some space is used to display documents and objects related to the life of Émile Waldteufel (1837-1915), a native of Bischheim who is considered the father of the French waltz, and who was named director of dance music for Napoleon III in 1865.

Notes

Sources

 

Alsatian Jews
Monuments historiques of Bas-Rhin
Jews and Judaism in France